Frankenstein Meets the Space Monster (sometimes stylized as Frankenstein Meets the Spacemonster) is a 1965 science fiction film. It was directed by Robert Gaffney and starred Marilyn Hanold, James Karen and Lou Cutell. It was filmed in Florida and Puerto Rico in 1964.

Plot
The film tells the story of a facially-damaged android robot who fights alien invaders. Despite the title, neither Dr. Frankenstein nor Frankenstein's monster appear in the film. However, it is stated near the beginning of the movie that the android is partially built from human pieces and he is also often called by the first name of Frank.

All of the women on the planet Mars have died in an atomic war, except for Martian Princess Marcuzan (Marilyn Hanold). Marcuzan and her right-hand man, Dr. Nadir (Lou Cutell), decide they will travel to Earth and steal all of the women on the planet in order to continue the Martian race. The Martians shoot down a space capsule carrying the android astronaut Colonel Frank Saunders (Robert Reilly), causing it to crash land in Puerto Rico. Frank's electronic brain and the left half of his face are damaged after encountering a trigger-happy Martian and his ray gun. Frank, now the "Frankenstein" of the title, described by his creator as an "astro-robot without a control system", proceeds to terrorize the island. A subplot involves the Martians abducting beautiful bikini-clad women for the purpose of breeding.

The "Space Monster" of the title refers to a radiation-scarred mutant named Mull brought along as part of the Martian invasion force. The "Frankenstein" android and Mull battle each other at the end of the film and both are destroyed.

Release information
The film was released in the United Kingdom as Duel of the Space Monsters. It is also known as Frankenstein Meets the Space Men, Mars Attacks Puerto Rico, Mars Invades Puerto Rico and Operation San Juan. Released by the Futurama Entertainment Corp., it was released on DVD by Dark Sky Films in 2006. In the United States, it was initially released on a double feature with Curse of the Voodoo.

The film was ranked #7 in the 2004 DVD documentary The 50 Worst Movies Ever Made.

Cast
Marilyn Hanold as Princess Marcuzan
James Karen as Dr. Adam Steele (as Jim Karen)
 Lou Cutell as Dr. Nadir
Nancy Marshall as Karen Grant
David Kerman as Gen. Bowers
Robert Reilly as Col. Frank Saunders/Frankenstein
Robert Alan Browne as Martian crewmember (uncredited)
Robert Fields as reporter (uncredited)
Bruce Glover as Martian crewmember/Mull the Space Monster (uncredited)
Susan Stephens as blonde surf-bather (poster girl) (uncredited)

See also
 List of American films of 1965
 Invaders from Mars (1953 film)
 Plan Nine from Outer Space
 Santa Claus Conquers the Martians
 The Day Mars Invaded Earth
 Zombies of the Stratosphere

References

External links
 
 
 

1965 films
1960s science fiction films
American science fiction horror films
Allied Artists films
Films about extraterrestrial life
Films set in Puerto Rico
Films shot in Florida
Films shot in Puerto Rico
Mars in film
Frankenstein films
American black-and-white films
Films about princesses
1960s English-language films
1960s American films